Richard Tillman may refer to:
 Richard J. Tillman, member of the Florida House of Representatives
 Dick Tillman, American Olympic sailor
 Richard Tillman, brother of American football player and U.S. Army Ranger Pat Tillman